Celaenorrhinus selysi is a species of butterfly in the family Hesperiidae. It is found in the south-eastern part of the Democratic Republic of the Congo.

References

Butterflies described in 1955
selysi
Endemic fauna of the Democratic Republic of the Congo